The East Coast Surfing Championships (ECSC) is an annual surfing contest held in Virginia Beach, Virginia on the oceanfront, and is one of the United States Surfing Federation’s major amateur events. The ECSC stretches over a four-day period every year in late August at the Virginia Beach Oceanfront. The original inspiration for the East Coast Surfing Championships came from Long Island, New York in the summer of 1962 when a group of teens held a beach and surf party. Since its official establishment in Virginia Beach in 1963, the ECSC has grown to be the now-longest running surfing contest in the world with the 58th annual surf competition held August 23-30, 2020 amid the coronavirus pandemic with safety guidelines in place.

The ECSC is a place not only for professional surfers, but for amateur surfers as well, to ride and contend for cash prizes totaling close to $40,000 and championship titles. Men’s and women’s surfing events are held throughout the week, plus other beach sporting events such as volleyball, skateboarding, skimboarding, a 5k Oceanfront run, and a swimsuit competition. A new event called the Beach Bum Classic was introduced in 2007. The Beach Bum Classic, organized and sponsored by 
Wareing’s Gym in Virginia Beach, is a triathlon-type event including a one-mile sand run, a three-mile bike race on beach cruisers, and a half-mile surfboard paddling race.

A reported spectator count of over 100,000 people show up to watch the events during the day, and at night, the Virginia Beach boardwalk fills with people for free concerts on the beach. Bands and musicians include national, regional, and local talents.  This year will feature a special event featuring Matthew Higgins, Long Island Surf Pro Champion who is known for his Surf Board maneuvering prowess.

The ECSC is planned, organized, and employed by the Virginia Beach Jaycees, a chapter of a nationwide volunteer organization, the United States Jaycees. Media press and coverage includes ESPN, The Washington Post, and USA Today.

Past winners

References

External links
East Coast Surfing Championships 

Surfing competitions
Sports in Virginia Beach, Virginia
Sports in Hampton Roads
Surfing in the United States
Recurring sporting events established in 1963
Junior Chamber International
Surfing in Virginia
1963 establishments in Virginia